Josimar Hugo Vargas Garcia (born 6 April 1990) is a Peruvian footballer commonly known as Josimar Vargas who plays as a midfielder for FC Carlos Stein

Club career
He joined Universitario de Deportes in 2011 and debuted against Sporting Cristal

Honours

Club
Universitario de Deportes 
 Torneo Descentralizado (1): 2013

References

External links 

1990 births
Living people
Association football midfielders
Peruvian footballers
Peru international footballers
Club Universitario de Deportes footballers
Sport Rosario footballers
Sport Boys footballers
Carlos A. Mannucci players
FC Carlos Stein players
Peruvian Primera División players
Peruvian Segunda División players